David Luther Foutz (September 7, 1856 – March 5, 1897) was a Major League Baseball player for 13 seasons.

Early life
David Luther Foutz was born in Carroll County, Maryland on September 7, 1856, the son of Solomon Augustus Foutz and Miriam Cook. Always known as Dave, he was asthmatic all his life. When he was 21 Foutz drifted out to Leadville, Colorado and worked for a while in the lead mines. While in Leadville, Foutz started playing baseball, pitching for the Leadville Blues, an amateur team. Shortly after, he signed with the Bay City, Michigan minor league team, where he played until 1884. By 1884, Foutz's talent had been spotted by Chris von der Ahe, the owner of the St. Louis Browns of the American Association. He wanted Foutz's contract so badly he bought the entire Bay City, Michigan franchise. Before joining the major league, Foutz acquired a reputation as a gambler and drinker, figuring if he was going to die young, he would enjoy himself before.

Major League Baseball career

As a player, Dave Foutz was often called "Scissors" and other nicknames, due to his tall (6 foot 2 inch) and thin (161 pounds) build. His first six seasons in the major leagues were spent in the American Association with the St. Louis Browns, all the while suffering from asthma. With the Browns he became their powerhouse right-hander who helped St. Louis win four straight American Association pennants. Along the way, Foutz built up an impressive record and on April 10, 1885, in an exhibition game, Foutz pitched a no-hitter to defeat the St. Louis Maroons, 7–0. Later on June 3, 1886, Foutz pitched a shutout against Brooklyn in what became a 19–0 rout.

But on August 14, 1887 while pitching against the Cincinnati Reds for St. Louis, Foutz was hit by a ball and suffered a broken thumb on his throwing hand. Sidelined for nine weeks, when Foutz eventually returned to pitching‚ he was ineffective and his pitching career was virtually ended. While he was pitching, Foutz won 114 games over a four-year span from 1884–1887, with a career high of 41 in 1886. He ended up with a 147–66 record, which is a .690 percentage and is tied for third-best ever.  In 1887, Foutz achieved a rare feat when he won 20 or more games as a pitcher (25) and drove in 100 or more runs as a hitter (108).

Leading up to the 1888 season, Foutz made the news when Chris von der Ahe, owner of the St. Louis Browns, sold the contracts for the not fully recovered Foutz, along with pitcher Bob Caruthers and catcher Doc Bushong. The sale was to the Brooklyn Bridegrooms and their owner Charlie Byrne, who paid what was then the enormous sum of $19,000 for the trio.

After the injury, Foutz pitched little for Brooklyn but helped the team to the 1889 American Association pennant and the 1890 National League flag.  In both seasons, he was the regular first baseman.  Later for four seasons (1893–96), Foutz was a playing manager, but Brooklyn never finished higher than fifth and Foutz was forced to resign in October 1896 after the end of the 1896 season.

Unassisted pickoff

Foutz is remembered for one great play that probably occurred in the game on September 3, 1886, where he picked off a runner unassisted. He was playing for the St. Louis Browns, who were facing the Louisville Colonels. The play was apparently orchestrated by a signal from catcher Doc Bushong, with Charles Comiskey playing first base. On base, the runners for the Colonels were Pete Browning on first and John Kerins on second.

Later life

In 1889, Foutz married 28-year-old Minnie M Glocke and they lived in Brooklyn. Afterwards, he and his wife were constant companions and Foutz appeared to settle down from his younger days. But six years later, in 1895 Foutz's wife was institutionalized in an insane asylum and likely remained there until she died in 1898. Never in good health, in January 1896, Foutz became dangerously ill with pneumonia and barely recovered. After he was released from the Bridegrooms in October 1896, Foutz was considered for a manager in the minor leagues or as a possible umpire, but by January 1897, he was too ill to work and was under a doctor's care. On March 5, 1897, Foutz died at his mother's home in Waverly, a suburb of Baltimore, Maryland, of an asthma attack. He was buried in the Loudon Park Cemetery, in Baltimore City, Maryland. Newspapers reported his funeral was a sad and somber affair, attended by many former teammates and baseball players. Also in attendance were executives from the National League as well as his old Brooklyn and St. Louis ball clubs.

See also

 List of Major League Baseball player-managers
 List of Major League Baseball annual ERA leaders
 List of Major League Baseball annual saves leaders
 List of St. Louis Cardinals team records

References

Further reading
Full Obituary Sporting Life, March 13, 1897, page 5.

External links

Baseball-Reference.com – career managing record and playing statistics

1856 births
1897 deaths
Major League Baseball pitchers
Major League Baseball first basemen
Baseball players from Maryland
St. Louis Browns (AA) players
Brooklyn Bridegrooms players
Brooklyn Grooms players
Major League Baseball player-managers
Brooklyn Bridegrooms managers
19th-century baseball players
Bay City (minor league baseball) players
People from Carroll County, Maryland
Respiratory disease deaths in Maryland
Deaths from asthma
Leadville Blues players